Tigers in Lipstick is a 1979 Italian comedy film directed by Luigi Zampa, starring Ursula Andress, Laura Antonelli, Sylvia Kristel and Monica Vitti. It was Zampa's final film. It is an anthology of 8 unrelated vignettes, each involving a very attractive woman. The four lead actresses star in two vignettes each.

Plot
A woman (Kristel) lures a man into her room for a mysterious purpose; a schoolboy gets a prostitute (Vitti) to pretend to be his mother at an interview with the school principal; a reporter's interview with a recent widow (Andress) takes an unusual turn; a woman (Antonelli) finds a permanent way to end her husband's jealousy; a woman (Kristel) finds her husband unenduringly boring; a woman (Vitti) tries to recover a stolen necklace she herself just stole; a woman (Andress) causes traffic accidents by seductively distracting male drivers; a shy orchestra conductor has his tryst with a businesswoman (Antonelli) constantly interrupted.

Cast
 Ursula Andress as The Stroller / The Widow
 Laura Antonelli as The Wife / The Businesswoman
 Sylvia Kristel as The Lady on the Bed / The Unhappy Wife
 Monica Vitti as Maria, the fake mother / The Thief
 Orazio Orlando as Fioroni / The Arab
 Michele Placido as Angelo / The Photographer
 José Sacristán as The Musician
 Roberto Benigni as The Principal
 Enrico Beruschi as The Professor
 José Luis López Vázquez as Garage Owner

References

External links

1979 films
1979 comedy films
1970s sex comedy films
1970s Italian-language films
Italian anthology films
Italian sex comedy films
Commedia sexy all'italiana
Films directed by Luigi Zampa
Films scored by Riz Ortolani
1970s Italian films